The 1991 Individual World Championship was held in Johannesburg, South Africa, which was won by John Dixon of USA. The championship was boycotted by several shooters and not widely publicized. There were no team awards, and the championship was called an Individual Championship in distinction to the regular IPSC World Shoot title.

Individual champions

See also 
IPSC Rifle World Shoots
IPSC Shotgun World Shoot
IPSC Action Air World Shoot

References

Match Results - 1991 Individual World Championship, South Africa, page 76 of 80

1991 Individual
1991 in shooting sports
Shooting competitions in South Africa
1991 in South African sport
International sports competitions hosted by South Africa